L'Homme à tête de chou (The cabbage-headed man) is the first posthumous studio album by Alain Bashung, issued in November 2011 on Barclay Records. It is a track-by-track rerecording of the album of the same name by Serge Gainsbourg, originally recorded as the soundtrack to a dance show by Jean-Claude Gallotta.

Track listing

Personnel

Musicians 
 Alain Bashung - Vocals
 Denis Clavaizolle - Orchestration, arrangements, piano, keyboards, programmations, guitars, bass guitars
 Jean Lamoot - Programmations
 Éric Truffaz - Trumpet
 Frédéric Havet - Guitar
 Pierre Valéry Lobé, Mamadou Koné - Percussions
 Yann Clavaizolle - Drums
 Aurélie Chenille - Violin
 Guillaume Bongiraud - Cello
 Morgane Imbeaud - Background vocals

Production 
 element-s, Jérôme Witz: Drawings, graphism
 Guy Delahaye, Marie Fonte, Yannick Hugron, Sylvain Decloitre, Loriane Wagner, Béatrice Warrand, Thierry Verger, Bernard Leloup: Photos

Show 
 Jean-Claude Gallotta: Choreography
 Jean-Marc Ghanassia: Choreography production
 Flam: Executive production
 With support from the Centre Chorégraphique de Grenoble.

2011 albums
Barclay (record label) albums
Alain Bashung albums
Serge Gainsbourg tribute albums